The Blickling Park mausoleum is a Grade II* listed building in the grounds of Blickling Hall, Norfolk, England. It was commissioned in 1793 by Lady Caroline Suffield, the daughter of John Hobart, 2nd Earl of Buckinghamshire, as a tomb for her father and his two wives.  The structure was designed by the Italian architect Joseph Bonomi the Elder and built by Henry Wood.  It is in the form of a pyramid, modelled on that of Cestius in Rome,  as an early example of Egyptian Revival architecture. The structure is now in the ownership of the National Trust.

Design and construction 

The mausoleum was commissioned by Lady Caroline (wife of William Harbord, 2nd Baron Suffield), the eldest daughter of John Hobart, 2nd Earl of Buckinghamshire, in memory of her father who died in 1793.  Caroline, who inherited her father's estate Blickling Hall, commissioned the Italian architect Joseph Bonomi the Elder to design the structure.  Bonomi designed a mausoleum based on the ancient Pyramid of Cestius in Rome, in an early example of Egyptian Revival architecture.  Bonomi exhibited his design drawings at the Royal Academy of Arts, they are now stored in Blickling Hall.  The structure was erected between 1794 and 1796.

The structure is a square-based pyramid constructed from more than 190,000 Portland stone blocks, that were finished on site by the builder, Henry Wood. When constructed the stone was white but has since weathered to varying shades of grey. The east face of the pyramid contains a central doorway surrounded with an architrave and surmounted with an entablature. The entablature is engraved with the Hobart family motto auctor pretiosa facit (Latin: "the giver makes the gift precious"). Atop the entablature is a carved depiction of the Hobart arms, crowned and supported by a hound and a stag. The panelled door has two leaves, each of which weighs .

The north and south faces have a central, square window opening with moulded stone architrave.  The west face contains a memorial panel, with architrave.  The panel notes that the structure was erected in memory of Hobart by his widow and Harbord.  The panel is surmounted by a carved stone bull.  The bull is a symbol associated with the Hobart family and stems from a desire to associate themselves with Anne Boleyn, whose childhood home was Blickling and whose family symbol was a bull.

The interior of the mausoleum is a single chamber used as a chapel.  It has a domed vaulted roof with a dentilled cornice.  The chamber has eight recesses, one is used for the door and two for the windows, the recesses in between these are used for wall-mounted memorials and the final three recesses (which face the entrance) contain tombs for Hobart; his first wife Mary Anne and his second wife Caroline.  The tombs are in the form of marble sarcophagi raised on plinths.  The floor is paved in marble.

Later history 
In 1806 Edmund Bartell described the mausoleum in his Guide to Cromer: "Its situation is very happily chosen in the midst of a large and venerable wood, whose solitude appears only to be broken by the prying curiosity of the stranger, or the footsteps of the nimble deer".  Through Caroline's marriage to Suffield the Blickling estate came into the possession of the Kerr family.  It was bequeathed to the National Trust by Philip Kerr, 11th Marquess of Lothian in 1940.  At some stage iron railings were added around the perimeter of the structure.

The mausoleum became a listed building on 19 January 1952 and now holds a Grade II* listing.  The interior was described as being in a very poor condition in 1978 and in 2002 the structure was noted to be subject to occasional vandalism.  The National Trust, which describes the mausoleum as "one of Blickling’s most iconic landmarks", is fundraising for repairs to the structure, to include replacement for the worn door hinges.

Gallery

References 

Mausoleums in England
Monuments and memorials in Norfolk
Grade II* listed monuments and memorials
Grade II* listed buildings in Norfolk
Buildings and structures completed in 1796
Pyramids in Europe
Blickling